In October 2006, German troops in Afghanistan were in the centre of an international scandal of them posing with human skulls. Six servicemen were suspended over the first case, and a total of 23 were being investigated in connection with the incident.

The events took place during the War in Afghanistan (2001–2021), and included German soldiers taking photographs of each other posed with skulls, including kissing the skulls.

References

External links
 German skull row troops suspended BBC
 German army acts over skull row BBC
 German troops set for wider role BBC
 Europe diary: German might BBC
 German warships head for Lebanon BBC

Military history of Germany
German Troops Controversy, 2006
Political scandals in Germany
War in Afghanistan (2001–2021)
2006 in Afghanistan
Afghanistan–Germany military relations
Military scandals